Peyia 2014 is Cypriot football club based in Peyia of the Paphos District.

History 
The club was founded in 2014 after the merger of two clubs: Peyia FC 2012 and PAS Peyia.

References 

Football clubs in Cyprus
Association football clubs established in 2014
2014 establishments in Cyprus